Sir Arthur Leycester Scott Coltman (24 May 1938 – 2003), known as Leycester Coltman, was the British ambassador to Cuba from 1991 to 1994.

Coltman was educated at Rugby School and Magdalene College, and spent a sabbatical year at the Manchester Business School.  After joining the British Diplomatic Service, he served in Copenhagen, Cairo, Brasília, Mexico City, and Brussels, and served as the British ambassador to Cuba 1991–94 and to Colombia 1994–98.

Coltman was ambassador to Cuba during the post-Cold War upheaval that saw the Soviet Union withdraw its troops and foreign aid, and he had access to Fidel Castro.  He authored a biography, The Real Fidel Castro, about his experiences, which was published shortly after his death in 2003.

References

External links 
 Review of The Real Fidel Castro, The New Statesman, 9 February 2005

1938 births
2003 deaths
People educated at Rugby School
Alumni of Magdalene College, Cambridge
Ambassadors of the United Kingdom to Cuba
Ambassadors of the United Kingdom to Colombia
British biographers
20th-century biographers